The 1980 Great Taste Discoverers season was the sixth season of the franchise in the Philippine Basketball Association (PBA). The team was known as Presto Fun Drinks in the All-Filipino Conference.

Transactions

Summary
In the Open Conference, the Discoverers had returning import Jim Hearns, who saw action for the team last season, being paired with 6-11 Lewis Brown, a Milwaukee Bucks' draftee and the tallest among the crop of imports.  Great Taste won eight of their nine games in the first round of elimination phase and losing only to Toyota Tamaraws. Great Taste finish second behind Toyota in the team standings after 18 games with 13 wins and five losses. In the semifinal round, the Discoverers lost all their six assignments and were swept in three games by Crispa Walk Tall Jeans in their series for third place.

The CFC ballclub known as Presto Fun Drinks in the All-Filipino Conference have lost all their nine outings in the one-round eliminations as the franchise set a season record for the longest losing streak by any PBA team at 18 games.

Won-loss record vs Opponents

Roster

References

Great
Great Taste Coffee Makers seasons